Buuz (/Buuza, Chinese: 包子/Baozi) is a type of Mongolian steamed dumpling filled with meat. An example of authentic Mongolian and Buryatian cuisine, the dish is traditionally eaten at home during Tsagaan Sar, the Lunar New Year. These days it is also offered at restaurants and small cafes throughout the capital city of Ulaanbaatar.

History and function
Buuz is the Mongolian version of the steamed dumpling which is commonly found throughout the region. Etymologically, it reveals its origin to China, as baozi is the Mandarin word for steamed dumpling. They are eaten in great quantities throughout the year but especially during the Mongolian New Year celebrations, which usually fall in February. Buuz are prepared in the weeks before and left outside to freeze; they are consumed with salads and fried bread, accompanied by suutei tsai (Mongolian tea) and vodka.

Ingredients and preparation

Buuz are filled with minced lamb and mutton or beef, which is flavoured with onion and/or garlic and salted. Occasionally, they are flavoured with sprouted fennel seeds and other seasonal herbs. Mashed potato, cabbage, or rice may be added as well.

The meat ball is then placed inside a small pocket of dough which is folded around the ball with a small opening at the top and in the chef's own personal style. The buuz is then steamed and eaten by hand, with the dough pocket catching the juices of the meat.

The filling in buuz is similar to another Mongolian dumpling, khuushuur; however, the latter is fried.

See also
Khuushuur
Gürzə, the Azerbaijani equivalent
Khinkali, the Georgian equivalent
Gyoza, the Japanese equivalent
Jiaozi and baozi, Chinese equivalents
Mandu, the Korean version
Mantı, the Turkic/Central Asian version
Modak, the Indian equivalent
Kozhukkattai, the Tamil equivalent
Momo, Nepalese and Tibetan equivalent
Pelmeni, the Russian equivalent
Vareniki, the Ukrainian/Polish/Lithuanian equivalent
List of steamed foods

References

External links
Buuz recipe from mongolfood.info

Mongolian cuisine
Buryat cuisine
Tuvan cuisine
Kalmyk cuisine
Altai cuisine
Dumplings
National dishes
Steamed foods